Tanypeza is a genus of flies in the family Tanypezidae.

Species
Tanypeza longimana Fallén, 1820
Tanypeza picticornis Knab & Shannon, 1916

References

Nerioidea genera
Nerioidea
Diptera of Europe
Diptera of North America
Taxa named by Carl Fredrik Fallén